Phenylglycine is the organic compound with the formula C6H5CH(NH2)CO2H.  It is a non-proteinogenic alpha amino acid related to alanine, but with a phenyl group in place of the methyl group.  It is a white solid. The compound exhibits some biological activity.

Preparation
It is prepared from benzaldehyde by amino cyanation (Strecker synthesis).
It can also be prepared from glyoxal and by reductive amination of phenylglyoxylic acid.

Ester
The ester methyl α‐phenylglycinate is used to convert carboxylic acids into homologated unsaturated ketones.  These reactions proceed via cyclization of phenylglycinamides to oxazolones, which can be reductively cleaved with chromous reagents.

See also
 N-Phenylglycine
 (RS)-MCPG

References

Amino acids